Andréia de Assis Horta (born 27 July 1983) is a Brazilian actress. Horta was born in Juiz de Fora, Minas Gerais.

Career
Horta played the role of Renata in the Rede Record's telenovela Alta Estação, and played the role of Beatriz in Chamas da Vida, which is another Rede Record telenovela. She has appeared in Globo's series JK, as Márcia Kubitschek, and in 2008, she played the main character in HBO Ole's Alice. She played the lead role in the Rede Globo's TV series A Cura in 2010.

Aside from acting, she is the author of Humana flor, a book of poems, released on October 20, 2008, in São Paulo.

Filmography

References

External links

Q & A session at nochelatina

1983 births
Living people
Brazilian film actresses
Brazilian telenovela actresses
People from Juiz de Fora
21st-century Brazilian women writers
21st-century Brazilian writers